The Ishana dynasty, rulers of the Kingdom of Mataram, was a dynasty of the Hindu Mataram Kingdom on the island of Java. Ishana (Sanskrit: ईशान, IAST: Īśāna) refers to a Hindu god who is often considered to be one of the forms of the Hindu destroyer god Shiva. It followed the Sanjaya dynasty, and was established by Mpu Sindok, who moved the capital of the Mataram Kingdom from Central Java to East Java around the year 929. Coedes states, "Sindok, under his reign name Sri Isyana Vikramadharmatungadeva, was always considered the founder of Javanese power in the east of the island." Mpu Sindok's daughter and successor was Isanatungavijaya, who in turn was succeeded by her son Makutavamsavardhana, followed by Dharmawangsa. Pucangan inscription describe the reign of the Isyana dynasty came to an end when the revolt a vassal King Wurawari of Lwaram attacked and destroyed the capital in 1016.

Eventually, the ruler Airlangga restored and reunited the kingdom as Kahuripan. Airlangga's heirs ruled the Kingdom of Kediri and are thought to be the continuation of the Isyana dynasty.

See also
 Sanjaya Dynasty
 Kingdom of Mataram
 List of monarchs of Java

References

Hindu Buddhist states in Indonesia
Hindu dynasties
History of East Java
Precolonial states of Indonesia
10th century in Indonesia
11th century in Indonesia
Indonesian families
Mataram Kingdom